Letter, letters, or literature may refer to:

Characters typeface

 Letter (alphabet), a character representing one or more of the sounds used in speech; any of the symbols of an alphabet.
 Letterform, the graphic form of a letter of the alphabet, either as written or in a particular type font.
 Rehearsal letter in an orchestral score

Communication

 Letter (message), a form of written communication
 Mail
 Letters, the collected correspondence of a writer or historically significant person
Maktubat (disambiguation), the Arabic word for collected letters
Pauline epistles, addressed by St. Paul to various communities or congregations, such as "Letters to the Galatians" or "Letters to the Corinthians", and part of the canonical books of the Bible
 The letter as a form of second-person literature; see Epistle
 Epistulae (Pliny)
 Epistolary novel, a long-form fiction composed of letters (epistles)
 Open letter, a public letter as distinguished from private correspondence
 Letter to the editor, a letter sent to a newspaper, magazine, or online publication by one of its readers and meant to be published
 Encyclical letter in the Catholic Church
Letter (paper size), paper conventionally sized for letter-writing

Education

 Letters, an obsolete synecdoche for literacy; e.g. "He knows his letters"
 Literature as in Letters, Arts and Sciences
 Varsity letter, an award given in the U.S. for interscholastic or intercollegiate merit in a sport or other activity such as band or orchestra

Music
 Letters (Butch Walker album), 2004
 Letters (Jimmy Webb album), 1972
 Letters (Matt Cardle album), 2011
Letters (Bish album), 2020
 "Letters" (song), by Utada Hikaru, 2002

Places
 Letters, Ross-shire, a small village on the coast of Loch Broom, Scotland
 Letter railway station in Germany
 Letter, a townland in Kilcar, County Donegal, Ireland

People
 Douglas Letter, American lawyer and general counsel
 Stephan Letter (born 1978), German serial killer

Other uses
 LETTERS, an 1979 novel by John Barth
 John Letters, a Scottish manufacturer of golf clubs
 Letters (sculpture), a 1915 work by Charles Keck

See also
 The Letter (disambiguation)
 Letterer, a member of a team of comic book creators responsible for drawing the comic book's text
 Letterman (disambiguation)
 Lettering, and calligraphy